Washington College was a school in Tacoma, Washington. It was founded in Seattle, Washington in 1884 with an initial enrollment of 45 students. Washington College was sponsored by the Episcopal Church. Its companion school in Tacoma was the Annie Wright Seminary for Girls.

The 1891–1892 school year was the last with students. A proposed spring 1893 re-opening was coincident with the Panic of 1893, and never took place. The school officially closed in 1896, with its remaining assets dispersed to Annie Wright Seminary.

References

Defunct schools in Washington (state)
Schools in Pierce County, Washington
Educational institutions established in 1884
1884 establishments in Washington Territory
1896 disestablishments in Washington (state)
Educational institutions disestablished in 1896